Dean is a small township in Victoria, Australia. The Dean Post Office opened on 2 September 1861 and closed in 1980.

References

Towns in Victoria (Australia)
1861 establishments in Australia